Boninella hirsuta is a species of beetle in the family Cerambycidae. It was described by N. Ohbayashi in 1976.

References

Acanthocinini
Beetles described in 1976